James Ernest Piper (30 April 1884 – 25 May 1949) was an Australian rules footballer who played with  and  in the Victorian Football League (VFL). He later served as President of Geelong Football Club from 1923 to 1926.

References

External links 

1884 births
1949 deaths
Australian rules footballers from Victoria (Australia)
University Football Club players
Geelong Football Club players
People educated at Geelong College